Thabo Bennett Mnguni (born 18 March 1974) is a former South African international footballer who played as a midfielder.

Career
Mnguni started his career at Mamelodi Sundowns, before joining Russian club Lokomotiv Moscow on a two-and-three-quarter-year contract February 2002. Mnguni left Lokomotiv after a year and joined fellow Russian side Rostov before moving to Tianjin Teda in China in 2005. Mnguni returned to South Africa in 2006 with Mamelodi Sundowns, moving to AmaZulu for the first half of 2007 and Thanda Royal Zulu for the 2007–08 season. Mnguni once again moved abroad in 2008, signing for Okktha United in Myanmar.

International career
Mnguni represented South Africa twelve times between 2001 and 2004, most notably at the 2002 World Cup, and 2002 & 2004 African Cup of Nations.

Career statistics

International

References

1974 births
Living people
South African soccer players
South Africa international soccer players
FC Lokomotiv Moscow players
FC Rostov players
Tianjin Jinmen Tiger F.C. players
2002 FIFA World Cup players
2002 African Cup of Nations players
2004 African Cup of Nations players
Expatriate footballers in Myanmar
Mamelodi Sundowns F.C. players
Expatriate footballers in Russia
Association football midfielders
Soccer players from Pretoria
Expatriate footballers in China
Thanda Royal Zulu F.C. players
South African expatriate soccer players
Russian Premier League players